Ignacio Silva (born 16 February  1989) is a Chilean professional rugby union player. He plays as a flanker or Number 8 for the Selknam in Súper Liga Americana de Rugby where he has been named captain and for Chile as well as the Sudamerica XV internationally.

References

External links

YouTube Ignacio Silva Highlights

1989 births
Living people
Chilean rugby union players
Chile international rugby union players
Selknam (rugby union) players
Rugby sevens players at the 2019 Pan American Games
Pan American Games competitors for Chile
Rugby union flankers
Rugby union number eights